Spice World is a 1997 British musical comedy film directed by Bob Spiers and written by Kim Fuller. The film stars pop girl group the Spice Girls, who all play themselves. The film—made in a similar vein to The Beatles' A Hard Day's Night (1964)—depicts a series of fictional events leading up to a major concert at London's Royal Albert Hall, liberally interspersed with dream sequences and flashbacks as well as surreal moments and humorous asides, along with having an antagonist in the form of an overzealous newspaper editor who starts a smear campaign against the group in an attempt to destroy their reputation for his own benefit.

This is the second feature-length film directed by Spiers, following That Darn Cat (1997). The film features Richard E. Grant, Claire Rushbrook, Naoko Mori, Meat Loaf, Barry Humphries, and Alan Cumming in supporting roles, with cameo appearances by a number of British celebrities. Filming took place in London for six of the eight filming weeks and also inside Twickenham Studios, as well as at over 40 famous British landmarks. Shooting featured several fourteen-hour shooting sessions and a constant, heavy media presence due to the Spice Girls' then-large popularity.

The film premiered in the United Kingdom on 15 December 1997, ahead of its wide theatrical release on the British holiday Boxing Day (26 December). In North America, it was released on 23 January 1998 by Columbia Pictures. In the United States, Spice World became a box office success and broke the record for the highest-ever weekend debut for Super Bowl weekend with box office sales of $10.5 million. The film grossed over $100 million at the worldwide box office. Despite being a box office success, the film received primarily negative reviews.

To celebrate its 20th Anniversary in 2017, Spice World was given a limited release across the United Kingdom showing at Odeon Cinemas. Spice World is the highest-grossing film of all time by a musical group.

Plot
The Spice Girls are dissatisfied with the burdens of fame and fortune. Meanwhile, sinister newspaper owner Kevin McMaxford is trying to ruin the girls' reputation for his ratings. McMaxford dispatches photographer Damien to take pictures and tape recordings of the girls. Piers Cuthbertson-Smyth, with his camera crew, stalks the girls, hoping to use them as subjects for his next project. At the same time, the girls' manager, Clifford, is fending off two over-eager Hollywood writers, Martin Barnfield and Graydon, who relentlessly pitch absurd plot ideas for the girls' feature film.

Amid this, the girls must prepare for their live concert at the Royal Albert Hall in three days, which will be the biggest performance of their music career. At the heart of it, the constant rehearsals, travelling, publicity appearances and other burdens of celebrity affect the girls on a personal level, preventing them from spending much time with their best friend, Nicola, who is due to give birth soon. Throughout the busy schedule, the girls try to ask Clifford for time off to spend with Nicola and relax, but Clifford refuses after talking with the head of the girls' record label, the cryptic and eccentric "Chief". The stress and overwork compound, which culminate in the girls' huge argument with Clifford. The girls suddenly storm out on the evening before their gig at the Albert Hall.

The girls separately think back on their humble beginnings and their struggle to the top. They reunite by chance outside the abandoned café where they practised during their adolescent years, they reconcile, and decide to take Nicola out dancing. However, Nicola's contractions start at the nightclub and she is rushed to the hospital, where she gives birth to a healthy baby girl. When Emma notices that the delivery "doctor" has a camera, the girls realize that he is Damien, who flees with the girls in hot pursuit, only to hit his head after accidentally colliding with an empty stretcher. When Damien sees the girls standing over him, he tells them that they have made him realise he's "been living a meaningless lie", and he goes after McMaxford, who is subsequently fired in a "Jacuzzi scandal". After noticing the girls' bus driver, Dennis, is missing, Victoria decides to take the wheel. It becomes a race against time as Victoria drives recklessly through the streets of London to the Albert Hall. While approaching Tower Bridge, the bridge starts being raised to let a boat through the River Thames. Victoria drives up the bridge and over the gap. The bus lands safely on the other side, but when Emma opens a trapdoor in the floor, she discovers a bomb, and the girls scream before Emma slams the trapdoor shut again.

The girls finally arrive at the Albert Hall for their performance. However, the girls have one more obstacle to overcome: a London policeman charges them with "dangerous driving, criminal damage, flying a bus without a licence, and frightening the pigeons". Emma is pushed forward and explains to the policeman that she and the other girls were late for their performance at the Albert Hall. Emma smiles at the policeman, and he lets the girls off for their performance. The girls open their Albert Hall concert with their song "Spice Up Your Life", which is broadcast live on global television. The supporting cast later talk about the girls' film during its closing credits. Melanie C breaks the fourth wall and tells the other girls that the outgoing audience is watching them. The girls talk to the audience, commenting on "those two in the back row snogging" and on one's dress, and discuss about their film, just minutes before the bomb in their bus explodes.

Cast

Production

Development

As the popularity of the Spice Girls grew, The Walt Disney Company approached the band about making a film. The band turned down Disney's offer as they did not like the "Disney-fied" script, which was about "a young single mother of one of the girls, fighting hardship to form the band." Kim Fuller, brother of the band's manager Simon Fuller, decided to write the screenplay for a Spice Girls movie himself.

According to Fuller, the script had to be revised many times to accommodate the growing number of celebrities hoping to take part in the film. Director Bob Spiers had been working in America on the Disney film That Darn Cat at the peak of the Girls' popularity. He was unaware of the group when first offered the job until his friend Jennifer Saunders advised that he take it. He arrived at a meeting with them in a New York hotel, unaware of what they looked like.

Casting
Frank Bruno was originally cast as the tour bus driver, but withdrew after a security guard prevented his son Franklin having an on-set photo taken with the girls. Mentions of Princess Diana and scenes featuring the designer Gianni Versace had to be edited out in post-production following their deaths shortly before the release of the film.

"Their company rang me up and asked if I would be in it", remarked Elvis Costello of his cameo. "I wouldn't have thought I was the kind of face you would get to do a cornflakes advert. Maybe twenty years ago. I was surprised."

Gary Glitter controversy
Glam rock musician Gary Glitter filmed a four-minute cameo appearance as himself, but shortly before release, he was arrested on child pornography offences. The Spice Girls and the production team agreed that his cameo should be deleted from the final print, although the band's performance of Glitter's "I'm the Leader of the Gang (I Am)" was retained. Glitter's scene has since been leaked online.

Filming
Spice World began filming in June and wrapped in August 1997. The film was to be set to the songs from the Girls' second studio album, but no songs had been written when filming began. The band thus had to do all the songwriting and recording at the same time as they were filming Spice World.

Music
An official motion picture soundtrack has not been released, since their second studio album, Spiceworld, was released at the time, heavily promoted and serving as the film's soundtrack. The only song from Spiceworld not to appear in the film is "Move Over". The songs appearing in the film are in order of appearance.

"Too Much", the main single, debuted atop the UK Singles Chart, becoming the Spice Girls' second consecutive Christmas number-one single. It made the group the first act to reach number one with their first six singles, and the first to debut atop the chart five times in a row. The single spent two weeks at number one, and was certified platinum by the British Phonographic Industry (BPI) on 9 January 1998.

 Spice Girls - "Too Much (Spice World Version)" (Opening sequence)
 Spice Girls - "Do It"
 Spice Girls - "Say You'll Be There (Unplugged Concert Version)"
 Spice Girls - "Mama"
 Spice Girls - "Denying"
 Spice Girls - "Saturday Night Divas"
 Spice Girls - "Stop"
 Spice Girls - "2 Become 1"
 Spice Girls - "I'm the Leader of the Gang (I Am)"

 Spice Girls - "Never Give Up on the Good Times"
 Spice Girls - "Sound Off"
 Millie Small - "My Boy Lollipop"
 Spice Girls - "Viva Forever"
 Spice Girls - "Wannabe (Demo Version)"
 Spice Girls - "Who Do You Think You Are (Morales Club Mix Edit)"
 Spice Girls - "Spice Up Your Life (Live @ Albert Hall)"
 Spice Girls - "The Lady Is a Vamp" (Closing titles)

Release

Rating
In the United Kingdom, Spice World was granted a PG certificate by the British Board of Film Classification for "mild bad language, mild sex references". In the United States, it received a PG rating from the Motion Picture Association of America for "some vulgarity, brief nudity and language".

Merchandising
Official toy versions of the Spice Bus were produced upon the release of the movie.

Home media
The film was released on VHS in May 1998 in many regions including the UK, Germany, Spain, the Netherlands, Japan and Australia. In June 1998, it came out on VHS in the US and Canada. Despite concerns that the high-profile departure of Halliwell from the Spice Girls would affect sales, global demand for the VHS was high. In the UK, the film was number one on the video charts for six consecutive weeks, was certified 11× Platinum, and became the ninth best-selling video of 1998. In the US, the film peaked at number one on the video charts for five consecutive weeks and was the fifth best-selling video of 1998.

Spice World: The 10th Anniversary Edition was released on DVD on 19 November 2007 in the United Kingdom and Australia and on 27 November 2007 in the United States.

Spice World: The 20th Anniversary Edition was released on DVD on 7 February 2018 in Australia.

2017 re-release
In 2017, the film was screened at various cinemas in the UK, Ireland and Australia to mark its 20th anniversary.

Reception

Box office
Spice World was a number-one box office success in the United Kingdom, grossing £2.3 million during its opening weekend on Boxing Day 1997. It was the highest opening gross for a British production in the UK, surpassing the record set earlier in the year by Bean (excluding previews for Bean) and also set a record opening week gross for a British film in the U.K. with a gross of £4.8 million. The film was also successful in the United States, breaking the record at that time for the highest-ever weekend debut for Super Bowl weekend (25 January 1998), with box office sales of $10,527,222. The film took in total $100 million at the box office worldwide.

Critical reception
The film received generally negative reviews from critics. Film review aggregation website Rotten Tomatoes gave Spice World a rating of 35% based on reviews from 68 critics, with an average rating of 4.7 out of 10 and a critic consensus that reads "Spice Worlds lack of cohesive plot will likely lose most viewers, but for fans of the titular girl group there's more than enough fun to be had in their wacky -- albeit superficial -- whirlwind of an adventure." On Metacritic, the film has a 32 out of 100 rating, based on 16 critics, indicating "generally unfavorable reviews". AllMovie gave it two out of five stars.

Noted American film critic Roger Ebert gave one-half of a star and listed Spice World as one of his most hated films, saying: "The Spice Girls are easier to tell apart than the Mutant Ninja Turtles, but that is small consolation: What can you say about five women whose principal distinguishing characteristic is that they have different names? They occupy Spice World as if they were watching it: They're so detached they can't even successfully lip-synch their own songs." And when he reviewed the film on his and Gene Siskel's film critique programme Siskel & Ebert, only three weeks into 1998, he declared that he had already seen the worst film of that year, and called it "an entertainment-free dead zone". Ebert included the film on the Worst of 1998 special, but he chose Armageddon as the worst film of 1998.

Janet Maslin of The New York Times stated that the film "is pleasant and painless enough to amuse ardent fans, who figure in the film quite often." She also noted that while it got a PG rating in the United States, "nothing about it should disturb its target audience of media-wise, fun-loving 8-year-old girls." Writing for Sight and Sound, in a positive review, Mark Sinker placed it alongside The Monkees' 1968 cult film Head. He went on to say that it "sends up the amiable idiocy of pop packaging - and the slow witted mass-media response to it" and it was "tirelessly generous in its energy".

Derek Elley, resident film critic for Variety,  gave a mixed review, calling the film "bright and breezy" and "as timely but evanescent as the Cool Britannia culture it celebrates". He stated that the film would "delight the Fab Five's pre-pubescent fans" but that it would "be forgotten within six months".

Reappraisal
Several critics have reevaluated the film more positively in the years after its initial release. Re-watching Spice World in 2019, Alice Vincent of The Daily Telegraph was "pleasantly surprised" that the jokes had not aged badly and found the sets and costuming had a "now-retro charm". Vincent stated: "It's an irreverent, lighthearted romp that captured the brash, patriotic positivity of a London swept up in Cool Britannia." Writing for The New York Times in 2019, Eleanor Stanford found the film to be "much smarter and more self-aware than I once gave it credit for," particularly enjoying how the Spice Girls poked fun at themselves. Stanford concluded: "The Spice Girls were absolutely working the (very sexist) system, and making a lot of money off it, but they were doing it slyly, with a wink and a grin. They were, I think, misunderstood at the time, and I wonder if an irreverent, breezy group like theirs could even exist today."

Accolades
The film has been listed in Golden Raspberry Awards founder John Wilson's book The Official Razzie Movie Guide as one of "The 100 Most Enjoyably Bad Movies Ever Made". Along with the nominations and wins racked up at the 1998 Stinkers Bad Movie Awards, Spice World was listed in their upcoming "100 Years, 100 Stinkers" list, in which people voted for the 100 worst movies of the 20th century. The film was ranked at #5.

Legacy and cult status

Spice World has arguably achieved cult status. The film, while being negatively reviewed during its original release, is remembered fondly by many who were part of its target audience of younger pop fans at the time of its release. Some commentators consider the film to be a "cult classic", describing it as brilliant, even a masterpiece of the parody genre, that mocks both celebrity culture and cinematic clichés, while giving many winks to popular culture of the time. Several reviews have even made positive comparisons between SpiceWorld and the 1984 "rockumentary" parody film This Is Spinal Tap.

On 18 July 2014, the Spice Bus used in the film was put on permanent display at Island Harbour Marina, on the Isle of Wight, England.

Potential sequel 
In 2010, Bunton revealed that there were plans for a sequel following the first film's release, stating: "We would've liked to do another film, but after Spice World, there was an album, then a tour and then Geri left, so it didn't happen."

Speaking in January 2019, following the announcement of the Spice Girls reunion tour, Simon Fuller confirmed plans to make an animated sequel to Spice World. On 13 June 2019, it was reported that Paramount Animation president Mireille Soria had greenlit the project, with all five members of the band returning. The project will be produced by Simon Fuller, with Karen McCullah and Kiki Smith writing the screenplay, and will feature both previous and original songs. The film would feature the band as superheroes. A director has not yet been announced.

See also
 Spice Girls filmography
 List of films featuring extraterrestrials

References

Book references

External links
 
 
 
 
 

1997 films
1997 comedy films
1990s buddy comedy films
1990s English-language films
1990s female buddy films
1990s musical comedy films
British buddy comedy films
British female buddy films
British musical comedy films
Cultural depictions of Elton John
Films about film directors and producers
Films about filmmaking
Films about musical groups
Films set in London
Films shot in Buckinghamshire
Films shot in London
Films shot in Surrey
Golden Raspberry Award winning films
Icon Productions films
PolyGram Filmed Entertainment films
Self-reflexive films
Works about the Spice Girls
1990s British films